George Kenning may refer to:
 George Kenning (business consultant), American
 George Kenning (entrepreneur), English